Happy Yummy Chicken is a 2016 American musical comedy film directed by Anna Lloyd Bradshaw and starring Taryn Manning, Suzzanne Douglas, Emma Myles and Diane Guerrero.

The film premiered at the 2016 Hoboken International Film Festival.

Cast
Taryn Manning as Laura Splinterschloss
Diane Guerrero as Cheryl Davis
Suzzanne Douglas as Sarah Del Casserole
Emma Myles as Geraldine Spruce
Brandon Monokian as Brody McMillin
Erik Ransom as Matthew Mansfield
Ashley Biel as Marilyn Spalding
Elaine Bromka as Jenny
Julie Fain Lawrence as Lillian Landslide Thomas
Jessica Romano as Bonnie Alissa
Megan Greener as Mary Sue Harding
Noam Ash as Frank

References

External links
 
 
 

American musical comedy films
American mockumentary films
2016 films
2010s English-language films
2010s American films